Hash, hashes, hash mark, or hashing may refer to:

Substances
 Hash (food), a coarse mixture of ingredients
 Hash, a nickname for hashish, a cannabis product

Hash mark
Hash mark (sports), a marking on hockey rinks and gridiron football fields
 Hatch mark, a form of mathematical notation
 Number sign (#), also known as the hash, hash mark, or (in American English) pound sign
 Service stripe, a military and paramilitary decoration
 Tally mark, a counting notation

Computing
 Hash function, an encoding of data into a small, fixed size; used in hash tables and cryptography
 Hash table, a data structure using hash functions
 Cryptographic hash function, a hash function used to authenticate message integrity
 URI fragment, in computer hypertext, a string of characters that refers to a subordinate resource
 Geohash, a spatial data structure which subdivides space into buckets of grid shape
 Hashtag, a form of metadata often used on social networking websites
 hash (Unix), an operating system command
 Hash chain, a method of producing many one-time keys from a single key or password
 Password hash
 Zobrist hashing, a method of hashing chess positions into a key
Hashgraph, a Distributed ledger technology.

Other uses
 Hash House Harriers, a running club
Hash (EP) ([#]), a 2020 EP by Loona

See also
 Hash browns
 Hash House (disambiguation)